Rustam Singh may refer to:

Rustam Singh (poet), Indian poet, philosopher, translator and editor
Rustam Singh (politician), Indian politician